Fighter Squadron 96, or VF-96  Fighting Falcons was an aviation unit of the United States Navy in service from 1962 to 1975. When assigned to Carrier Air Wing Nine (CVW-9) their tailcode was NG, and their radio callsign was Showtime. Originally established as United States Naval Reserve squadron VF-791 Fighting Falcons on 20 July 1950 it was redesignated VF-142 after becoming a regular squadron on 4 February 1953. It was re-designated VF-96 on 1 June 1962 and disestablished on 1 December 1975.

History

VF-791 was assigned to Carrier Air Group 101 (CVG-101) aboard  for a deployment to the Western Pacific and Korea from 2 March to 24 October 1951. During this deployment VF-783 lost 4 F4U-4s.

VF-142 was assigned to Carrier Air Group 14 (CVG-14) aboard  for a Mediterranean deployment from 3 February to 6 August 1954.

VF-142 was assigned to CVG-14 aboard  for a deployment to the Western Pacific from 3 January to 27 July 1959.

VF-142 was assigned to CVG-14 aboard  for a deployment to the Western Pacific from 14 May to 15 December 1960.

VF-142 was assigned to Carrier Air Group 11 (CVG-11) aboard  for her voyage around South America from 11 August to 1 November 1961.

VF-96 was assigned to Carrier Air Wing Nine aboard the aircraft carrier USS Ranger for a deployment to the Western Pacific from 9 November 1962 to 14 June 1963.

Vietnam
VF-96 embarked aboard USS Ranger for a deployment to Vietnam from 5 August 1964 to 6 May 1965.

On 9 April 1965 an F-4B #151425 from VF-96 crashed into the sea following an engine flameout on launch for a four-plane combat air patrol. Later during the patrol an F-4B #151403 piloted by Lieutenant j.g. Terence M. Murphy and his RIO, Ensign Ronald Fegan, shot down a Chinese MiG-17 "Fresco" near Hainan, scoring the F-4 Phantom's first air-to-air victory. The Phantom was then shot down either by another MiG or, as enemy reports later indicated, an AIM-7 Sparrow from one of Murphy's and Fegan's wingmen. Murphy and Fegan were listed as killed in action, body not recovered.

VF-96 embarked aboard the aircraft carrier  for a deployment to Vietnam from 26 October 1965 to 21 June 1966.

On 12 February 1967, Lieutenant Commander Martin Sullivan and Lieutenant j.g. Paul Carlson flying F-4B #152219 crashed at sea during intercept training.

On 9 May 1968 USAF exchange pilot Captain John Heffernan and his RIO Lieutenant j.g. Frank Schumacher shot down a Vietnam People's Air Force (VPAF) MiG-21 with an AIM-7.

Six squadron F-4Js were destroyed and ten crewmen killed during the USS Enterprise fire on 14 January 1969.

VF-96 embarked aboard  for a deployment to Vietnam from 10 April to 21 December 1970.

VF-96 embarked aboard  for a deployment to Vietnam from 1 October 1971 to 1 July 1972. During this deployment, on May 10, Lieutenant Duke Cunningham and Lieutenant j.g. William P. Driscoll of VF-96 scored their aerial victories becoming the only US Navy aces of the war. Three more VPAF MiG-17s were downed by two other VF-96 crews that same day, two by Lieutenant Michael J. Connelly and Lieutenant Thomas J. Blonski and one by Lieutenant Steven C. Shoemaker and Lieutenant j.g. Keith V. Crenshaw.

VF-96 again embarked on Constellation for its final Vietnam cruise from 5 January to 11 October 1973.

Between June 21 and December 23, 1974 the Fighting Falcons along with sister-squadron VF-92 made its last operational deployment with CVW-9, aboard Constellation,  before being disestablished on December 1, 1975.

Home port assignments
NAS Jacksonville
NAS Miramar

Aircraft assignment
F4U-5 Corsair
F9F-6 Cougar
F-8C Crusader
F-4B/J Phantom II

Notable members
Pete Conrad
Duke Cunningham
William P. Driscoll
Richard F. Gordon, Jr.
Vincent O'Rourke
Lawrence E. "Larry" Wear Jr.

See also
History of the United States Navy
List of inactive United States Navy aircraft squadrons
List of United States Navy aircraft squadrons

References

External links

Strike fighter squadrons of the United States Navy